Humberto Ricardo Bustamante Cerda (born 19 May 1990) is a Chilean footballer who last played for Chilean Segunda División side San Antonio Unido as a centre back.

Club career
Born in Concepción, Bustamante began his career at Huachipato lower divisions where remained until 2008. Then, he moved to Universidad de Concepción where professionally debuted the Torneo Clausura in a 1–0 home loss with Deportes Melipilla.

In 2009, he was loaned to Club Deportivo Ferroviario Almirante Arturo Fernandez Vial from the Chilean third tier. There, he remained three years playing. Then, he returned to Universidad de Concepción in 2013 where he won the second division (Primera B) title.

In mid-2013, he joined Lota Schwager and faced the 2013–14 season, where he scored one goal and registered thirty two appearances.

During the 2014 World Cup break, he signed for Unión San Felipe. He played thirty three games there, scoring one goal.

On 29 June 2016, Bustamante joined first-tier team Deportes Iquique, but he arrived injured.

Honours

Club
Universidad de Concepción
 Primera B: 2013

References

External links
 
 
 Bustamante at Football-Lineups

1990 births
Living people
People from Concepción, Chile
People from Concepción Province, Chile
People from Biobío Region
Sportspeople from Concepción, Chile
Association football defenders
Chilean footballers
Chilean expatriate footballers
Universidad de Concepción footballers
C.D. Arturo Fernández Vial footballers
Lota Schwager footballers
Unión San Felipe footballers
Deportes Iquique footballers
Deportes Iberia footballers
Racing de Córdoba footballers
San Antonio Unido footballers
Primera B de Chile players
Chilean Primera División players
Segunda División Profesional de Chile players
Torneo Federal A players
Chilean expatriate sportspeople in Argentina
Expatriate footballers in Argentina